Ancient Heart is the debut studio album by British pop/folk singer-songwriter Tanita Tikaram, initially released by Warner Music Group on 13 September 1988. The album had huge success and was a hit globally, launching 19-year-old Tikaram's mainstream career. Guest musicians include Rod Argent, Mark Isham, Peter Van Hooke, Paul Brady, and Brendan Croker; Argent and Van Hooke also produced the album. Four singles were released from the album: "Good Tradition", "Twist in My Sobriety", "Cathedral Song" and "World Outside Your Window".

Track listing 
All words and music by Tanita Tikaram.
 "Good Tradition"
 "Cathedral Song"
 "Sighing Innocents"
 "I Love You"
 "World Outside Your Window"
 "For All These Years"
 "Twist in My Sobriety"
 "Poor Cow"
 "He Likes the Sun"
 "Valentine Heart"
 "Preyed Upon"

Personnel

Tanita Tikaram – vocals, guitar
Mark Isham – trumpet, flugelhorn
Paul Brady – mandolin
David Lindley – violin
Marc Ribot – guitar
Rod Argent – keyboards
Brendan Croker – guitar
Pete Beachill – trombone
Mitch Dalton – guitar
Martin Ditcham – percussion
John Georgiadis – violin
Keith Harvey – cello
Noel Langley – trumpet
Malcolm Messiter – oboe
Helen O'Hara – violin
Brendon O'Reilly – violin
Philip Todd – saxophone
Peter Van Hooke – drums
Clem Clempson – guitar
Mark Creswell – guitar
Ian Jewell – viola
Rory McFarlane – bass

Charts

Certifications and sales

References

1988 debut albums
Tanita Tikaram albums
Albums produced by Rod Argent
Albums produced by Peter Van Hooke